The Hillbilly Bears is an animated television series produced by Hanna-Barbera Productions, created by William Hanna  and Joseph Barbera. The series aired as a segment on The Atom Ant/Secret Squirrel Show from October 2, 1965 to September 7, 1967.

Overview
The Hillbilly Bears, played on a social stereotype of the "hillbilly", with a gun-toting, mumbling father Paw Rugg (voiced by Henry Corden) who was always "feudin'" (the "feudin'" was usually a lethargic operation, in which the protagonists fired the same bullet back and forth from the comfort of their rocking chairs) with their neighbors, the Hoppers.

Paw Rugg's voice was a low mumble, splattered with a few understandable words. Particularly in the first episodes, Paw Rugg's voice was incomprehensible; his speech improved with the later segments. His wife Maw (voiced by Jean Vander Pyl) was a homemaker who appeared as the more level-headed parent. Their daughter Floral (also voiced by Jean Vander Pyl) had lemon-colored fur (as opposed to the darker-colored fur of Maw, Paw and Shag); she was the Southern belle and most sophisticated member of the family. Shag (the youngest and smallest of the clan, voiced by Don Messick) was a troublemaker who looked up to his father. The voices and personas of Floral and Shag were nearly identical to Judy Jetson and Elroy from The Jetsons respectively.

List of episodes

Season 1 (1965)

Season 2 (1966)

Cast
 Don Messick - Shag Rugg
 Henry Corden - Paw Rugg
 Jean Vander Pyl - Maw Rugg, Floral Rugg
 Paul Frees - Claude Hopper

Home media
GoodTimes Home Video (under their Kids Klassics label) released a VHS tape of The Hillbilly Bears in the 1980s.

The episode "Woodpecked" is available on the DVD Saturday Morning Cartoons 1960's vol. 1.

The episode "Picnic Panicked" is available on the DVD Saturday Morning Cartoons 1960's Vol. 2.

Other appearances
Reruns of the Hillbilly Bears appeared as a segment on The Banana Splits Adventure Hour.

The Rugg Family appeared in Yogi's Ark Lark and its spin-off series Yogi's Gang.

Paw and Maw Rugg appeared in Yogi's Treasure Hunt.

The Rugg Family appeared in a Cartoon Network Shortie, "Miss Understanding" where Maw takes them on a Jerry Springer-like show due to the fact she cannot understand Paw, although the audience assumes that she means she does not "understand" him in the sense that she does not know who he is anymore. This results in Paw shooting on the wall with his gun the sentence "I luv you Maw".

On the Dexter's Laboratory episode "Chubby Cheese", an animatronic Paw Rugg is seen playing the xylophone during Chubby's song.

The Rugg Family appears in the Harvey Birdman, Attorney at Law episode "Guitar Control" defending their home from the SWAT team and Bear. Paw Rugg's name can also be seen in Harvey's black book in "Babysitter". Paw can be seen using a crowbar to tear off the logo for Sebben and Sebben in "The Death of Harvey".

Paw and Maw Rugg had a minor cameo in the Wacky Races episode "Grandfather Knows Dast" with Paw Rugg voiced by Billy West and Maw Rugg voiced by Jill Talley.

The Rugg Family all appeared in the HBO Max original series Jellystone! with Paw Rugg voiced by Jim Conroy, Ma Rugg voiced by Angelique Perrin, Floral Rugg voiced by Georgie Kidder, and Shag Rugg voiced by Ron Funches. The Rugg Family runs a cafe.

See also

The Atom Ant/Secret Squirrel Show

References

External links
The Hillbilly Bears - Cartoon Network Department of Cartoons (Archive)

The Hillbilly Bears at the Big Cartoon DataBase
The Hillbilly Bears at Don Markstein's Toonopedia. Archived from the original on February 5, 2016.

1965 American television series debuts
1967 American television series endings
1960s American animated television series
NBC original programming
American children's animated comedy television series
Animated television series about bears
Animated television series about children
Animated television series about families
Fictional hillbillies
Television series by Hanna-Barbera
Hanna-Barbera characters
Television series by Screen Gems